Lepinaria is a genus of leaf beetles in the subfamily Eumolpinae, found in Malaysia. It contains only one species, Lepinaria merkli. It is related to Lepina, but the body form resembles that of Pachnephorus.

References

Eumolpinae
Beetles of Asia
Insects of Malaysia
Monotypic Chrysomelidae genera